WC1 can refer to:

 Warcraft: Orcs and Humans, the first Warcraft computer game
 WC1, a postcode district in the WC postcode area for central London
 Wing Commander (video game), the first Wing Commander video game
 White Collar-1, a blue light photoreceptor in fungi